The golden triangle refers to the triangle formed by the university cities of Cambridge, London, and Oxford in the south east of England in the United Kingdom. The triangle is occasionally referred to as the Loxbridge triangle, a portmanteau of London and Oxbridge or, when limited to five members, the G5.

The list of universities considered to be members of the golden triangle varies between sources, but typically comprises the University of Cambridge, the University of Oxford, Imperial College London,  King's College London, the London School of Economics and University College London. Some sources omit either or both of King's College London and the London School of Economics. while occasionally other universities are included, e.g. the London Business School and the London School of Hygiene and Tropical Medicine, or all of the higher education institutions in the three cities.

Members
The universities typically considered members of the golden triangle possess some of the largest UK university financial endowments; endowment sizes range from UCL's £139 million (2019) to Cambridge's £6.44 billion (including colleges). Further, each university receives millions of pounds in research fundings and other grants from the UK government, criticised by leaders of some other universities as disproportionate and not in the best interests of the country as a whole. In 2013/14, universities in Oxford, Cambridge and London received 46% of research funding in the UK, up from 42.6% a decade earlier.

Research income
With the exception of the LSE, the five other institutions typically considered members of the golden triangle (sometimes referred to as the G5) have among the highest research incomes of all British universities, ranking in the top seven of British universities by research grant and contract income (along with Manchester and Edinburgh) and in the top six of English universities by Research England recurrent funding (along with Manchester). These five institutions
all have significant fractions of their research grant and contract income from clinical medicine, varying (in 2021/22) from 41.7% (Cambridge) to 63.6% (King's College London), compared to an average across the UK of 34.4%. Overall, 50.9% of the 2020/21 research grant and contract income of the five institutions (50.0% if the LSE is included) came from clinical medicine research, and they accounted for 34.7% of all research grant and contract income of UK universities in 2020/21 (35.2% if the LSE is included).

Following the 2021 Research Excellence Framework (REF), the golden triangle universities saw a fall in their share of Quality Research funding (recurring funding based on the REF results rather than grants or other sources) from Research England. Analysis by Times Higher Education showed that the share of funding going to the golden triangle (not including the LSE in this analysis) fell from 35.36 per cent in 2020/21 under the previous REF to 33.05 per cent in 2021/22, although the actual funding the institutions received increased due to an overall increase in funding levels and the five universities remained (with Manchester) the top six institutions by share of funding. The LSE saw a decrease in actual funding of 9.03 per cent, leading to a 0.28 percentage point fall in its share of funding to 0.85 per cent, placing it below the post-92 Northumbria University.

In 2004, the G5 universities were accused of secretly coordinating bids for an increased share of any extra money made available in the government's summer 2004 spending review. The objective was to secure extra state funding above the £3,000 student top-up fees planned in England from 2006 to cover the full costs of home and European Union undergraduates on their courses. This has been attributed to the universities stating they are offering no cheap courses, and that they would have to reduce their intake of UK students without the additional income.

The balance of funding between the 'golden triangle' and the rest of the UK has been questioned, and was specifically included in the terms of reference for an enquiry in 2018 by the House of Commons Science and Technology Select Committee. According to defenders of the level of funding going to the golden triangle institutions, "The apparent concentration of research in the golden triangle is little more than a reflection of the distribution of people in the UK". Analysis of grant proposals to Research Councils UK between 2012–13 and 2016–17 has shown that golden triangle institutions do not have unusually high success rates (two are actually below the expected range), but that the northern universities of Durham, Lancaster and York do. In February 2022, the UK Government announced as part of its "Levelling Up" White Paper that public investment outside of the south east would increase by 40% by 2030, despite warnings from leaders of research-intensive universities that this could reduce the importance of scientific excellence in funding decisions.

Rankings

World

Golden triangle universities generally do well on international rankings, which strongly reflect research performance. Some global rankings, such as those produced by Times Higher Education (THE) and QS, correct for the sizes of institutions in calculating their results but others, such as the Academic Ranking of World Universities (ARWU), make no such adjustment.

National

The Golden Triangle universities generally do well on British university league tables, with Cambridge and Oxford consistently in the top three, and Imperial, LSE and UCL ranked in the top ten by all compilers. King's College London, however, fails to make the top ten in any of the major rankings.

Student body

Admissions
The golden triangle universities are highly selective, with entrance typically requiring strong performances in standardised exams as represented by the average scores of new entrants when converted to UCAS points. Five of the golden triangle universities were in the top ten by entry standards for 2020–21, with King's coming in joint 19th. The universities also make up six of the eight British universities by lowest offer rates (the others being 3rd-placed St Andrews and 6th-placed Edinburgh). For the 2022 undergraduate admissions cycle, all of the universities reported offer rates, including conditional and unconditional offers, below 40%.

Demographics

Students from private education are over-represented at the six institutions. With the exception of King's, the remaining universities reported over 30% of their UK-domiciled student body in 2020-21 composed of private school students. This places the universities  among the nine highest UK providers with more than 10,000 students for the proportion of private school students with Imperial in 5th at 32.4% (behind Durham, St Andrews, Edinburgh and Exeter) followed by UCL (32.4%), Oxford (31.4%), LSE (30.4%) and Cambridge (30.0%). Nationally, around 6% of school-aged pupils attend education in the private sector, although this figure increases to as high as 18% for pupils aged 16-19. 

Among UK providers with more than 10,000 students, the LSE had the highest proportion of non-UK students in 2021-22 at 65.6% (followed by University of the Arts London), Imperial in 3rd at 52.7% and UCL in fourth at 51.6% (followed by St Andrews, Edinburgh and Hertfordshire) and King's in 8th at 41.3%. Totals as of 2021-22 for non-UK students broken down by level of study are:

Research in 2017 by the Institute for Fiscal Studies also indicates graduates from the LSE, Oxford and Imperial earn, on average, over £40,000 per year 5 years after graduation, making them the highest earners 5 years after graduation amongst British university graduates.

Gallery

See also
 Ivy League (older private universities in the United States)
 Imperial Universities (Japan)
 C9 League  The Chinese Ministry of Education's formal grouping of elite universities in China
 SKY (universities) (Korea) 
 Institutes of National Importance (India)
 Research-intensive cluster
 Global Medical Excellence Cluster
 MedCity (London)
 Russell Group A formal grouping of research universities in the UK
 SES-5 A formal grouping of universities in the South East of the UK
  Group of Eight A formal group of eight universities in Australia
Doxbridge, a portmanteau for a combination of Oxbridge and Durham University
Ancient universities Oxbridge, Scottish, and Irish Universities formed before the year 1600 with unique undergraduate MA awarding powers

Notes

References

Colloquial terms for groups of universities and colleges
Innovation in the United Kingdom
Universities in England